The Rio das Mortes ("River of the Dead") is a river of Mato Grosso state in western Brazil. It has a length of 580 km.

See also
List of rivers of Mato Grosso

References
Brazilian Ministry of Transport

Rivers of Mato Grosso